Brent Pendergrass is an American voice actor and lyricist.  He voiced the characters Eddie, Nate's Dad, Roughraff, Blazion, Noway, B3-NK1, Steppa, the Summoner, Gargaros and Sproink in the Disney XD animated series Yo-kai Watch. He also provided the same voices for the Nintendo 3DS Yo-kai Watch game and Hasbro's line of Yo-kai Watch toys. In 2017, he announced that he was leaving the franchise.

Career
Brent began his acting career on the PBS series, Space Racers where he played the role of the sunglass-wearing Sun in the music video "I Am the Sun." Later, he was cast in the role of Nate Adam's pal, Eddie in the TV series Yo-kai Watch. Although uncredited, he contributed to Yo-kai Watch in other ways by writing the lyrics for the Tribal Songs heard in the Yo-kai Watch game, toys and TV series.

Filmography

Film

Television

References

Living people
American male voice actors
Male actors from San Diego
1980 births